The Carhartt was an automobile manufactured in Detroit, Michigan, by the Carhartt Automobile Company from 1911–12.  The company claimed that "28 years of manufacturing success culminates in the Carhartt car," but this was based on the company's expertise in manufacturing overalls.

Two 4-cylinder models were advertised - the Junior 25 hp and Four 35 hp, with the latter having six different body styles, all priced at $2250. In 1912, a 50 hp Four was offered, priced from $2500 to $3500. Very few of these cars were built before Carhartt returned exclusively to the manufacturing of clothing.

See also
Brass Era car
 Carhartt, U.S.-based clothing company

References

Defunct motor vehicle manufacturers of the United States
Motor vehicle manufacturers based in Michigan
Companies based in Detroit